Bayleites is an extinct genus of cephalopod belonging to the Ammonite subclass.

References

Cretaceous ammonites
Ammonites of Europe
Santonian genus first appearances
Campanian genus extinctions